Glasgow is a home rule-class city in Barren County, Kentucky, United States. It is the seat of its county. Glasgow is the principal city of the Glasgow micropolitan area, which comprises Barren and Metcalfe counties. The population was 14,028 at the 2010 U.S. census.

The city is well known for its annual Scottish Highland Games. In 2007, Barren County was named the number one rural place to live by The Progressive Farmer magazine.

Geography
Glasgow is located in central Barren County at  (37.000375, -85.920229). U.S. Route 31E and U.S. Route 68 intersect at the center of the city, and the Louie B. Nunn Cumberland Parkway passes south of downtown, with access from three exits.

History
The city of Glasgow was established by the Kentucky state assembly in 1799. A post office was established in 1803, and the town received its city rights in 1809.

George Washington in Glasgow
Former U.S. President George Washington had a half-brother named Augustine Washington, Jr. who was the husband of Anne Aylett Washington and had a daughter named Elizabeth Washington. Elizabeth Washington married Alexander Eliot Spotswood and were given a home and land from George Washington (Elizabeth's uncle) in Glasgow. The home, called "Spotswood" after its first owner, Alexander Spotswood, is located at 309 N Race Street.

Historic homes

All across Glasgow are historic homes that can date back to the early 1800s. The most popular part of town with these homes is South Green Street; this street has many historic houses that have many different architectural styles including Colonial, Federal, and Victorian.

Civil War
The Civil War affected many smaller towns like Glasgow. There are many places that were part of the Underground Railroad in Glasgow, such as Big Spring Bottom for keeping horses and the Spotswood House on North Race Street for hiding enslaved people. Other places include the Old Glasgow Seminary Home on East Main Street; this house has several rooms dug out in the earth with tunnels running into them for keeping the enslaved people hidden and safe.

Western Kentucky University
Western Kentucky University was originally in Glasgow when it was established in 1875, but 10 years later it moved to its present-day location in Bowling Green and serves as WKU's main campus. Since 1998, WKU has operated a regional campus in Glasgow.

Demographics
As of the census of 2010, there were 14,208 people, 5,994 households, and 3,619 families residing in the city. The racial makeup of the city was 86.1% White, 8.0% Black, 0.1% Native American, 0.8% Asian, 0.2% Pacific Islander, 2.1% from other races, and 2.7% from two or more races. Hispanics or Latinos of any race were 4.3% of the population.

There were 5,994 households, of which 26.4% had children under the age of 18 living with them, 40.5% were married couples living together, 15.8% had a female householder with no husband present, and 39.6% were non-families. 34.6% of all households were made up of individuals, and 16.0% had someone living alone who was 65 years of age or older. The average household size was 2.23, and the average family size was 2.85.

The age distribution was 22.0% under the age of 18, 8.5% from 18 to 24, 25.9% from 25 to 44, 23.0% from 45 to 64, and 20.5% who were 65 years of age or older. The median age was 40 years. For every 100 females, there were 82.5 males. For every 100 females age 18 and over, there were 78.4 males.

The median income for a household in the city was $28,083, and the median income for a family was $36,677. Males had a median income of $31,123 versus $20,964 for females. The per capita income for the city was $18,697. About 14.1% of families and 19.5% of the population were below the poverty line, including 26.2% of those under age 18 and 20.9% of those age 65 or over.

Politics
Glasgow is governed by a mayor and city council.

Mayors of Glasgow:

 Henry Royse - January 2023 – present
 Harold Armstrong - January 2019 – December 2022
 Dick Doty - January 2015 - December 2018
 Rhonda Riherd Trautman - January 2011 - December 2014
 Darrell G. Pickett - January 2003 - December 2010
 Charles B. Honeycutt - January 1986 - December 2002
 Luska Twyman - September 1968 - December 1985
 Robert A. Lessenberry - January 1966 - September 1968
 Lynn Mayfield - January 1962 - December 1965
 William H. Grissom - January 1958 - December 1961
 W. Earl Walbert - January 1954 - December 1957
 Leslie Moran - January 1950 - December 1953
 Sewell C. Harlin - January 1946 - December 1949
 Winn Davis - January 1936 - December 1945
 J. E. Clayton - January 1926 - December 1935
 Brice T. Leech - January 1922 - December 1925

In the mid-1990s, Glasgow began its own cable system for television and internet access. The municipal service had saved its residents $32 million over proprietary providers through 2011.

In November 2008, the city voted Yes on Proposition 8, making it legal for restaurants to sell liquor by the drink to the public; package sales were still prohibited. Another vote in 2016 legalized liquor sales throughout all of Barren County, and also legalized package sales and liquor by the drink in taverns.

In April 2010, the city council voted for a citywide smoking ban in all indoor public places. The ban began officially on June 22, 2010.

Education
Glasgow Public Schools are part of the Glasgow Independent Schools. The district has two elementary schools, one middle school, and one high school. Keith Hale is the Superintendent of Schools.

The city system's schools include South Green Elementary School, Highland Elementary School, Glasgow Middle School, and Glasgow High School. The Barren County School System also has schools inside the Glasgow city limits, including Barren County High School, Trojan Academy, Red Cross Elementary School. and Barren County Middle School.

Glasgow has a public library, the Mary Wood Weldon Memorial Library.

Climate
The climate in this area is characterized by hot, humid summers and generally mild to cool winters. According to the Köppen Climate Classification system, Glasgow has a humid subtropical climate, abbreviated "Cfa" on climate maps.

Economy
Major employers in Glasgow include LSC Communications (formerly R. R. Donnelley, now closed), Akebono Brake Industry, Walmart, Nemak, and ACK Controls (a joint venture of Chuo Spring and Dura Automotive Systems). Other employers include South Central Rural Telephone Cooperative and Glasgow Independent Schools.

Notable people

 Walter Arnold Baker (1937-2010) :  Associate Justice, Kentucky Supreme Court, Assistant General Counsel for International Affairs in the Department of Defense, Member of Kentucky Senate and House of Representatives, Lieutenant Colonel, Kentucky Air National Guard. 
 Johnny Bell (born 1965), former Majority Whip in House of Representatives of Kentucky
 Jesse Bishop (1933–1979), convicted murderer executed in Nevada by gas chamber
 Willa Brown (1906–1992), first black woman to run for Congress (1946), and first black woman to receive a commercial pilot's license in the United States
 Richard E. Bush (1924–2004), Master Gunnery Sergeant, Medal of Honor recipient for service during World War II
 Kelly Craft (née Guilfoil; born 1962), Former United States Ambassador to the United Nations and United States Ambassador to Canada
 Nettie Depp (1874–1932), founder of first public four-year high school in Barren County (at Glasgow's former Liberty College), and first woman public official elected in Barren County (public school superintendent 1913–17)
 Russell E. Dougherty (1920–2007), 4-star General and former commander of the US Air Force Strategic Air Command
 Denny Doyle (born 1944), former Major League Baseball player
 Julian Goodman (1922–2012), former president of NBC
 Jim Gray (born 1953), Mayor of Lexington
 James G. Hardy (1795–1856), former lieutenant governor of Kentucky
 Dave Harris (born 1971), host of syndicated radio show Retro Rewind and songwriter
 Salty Holmes (1910–1970), singer and actor
 Darrin Horn (born 1972), former Western Kentucky University men's basketball coach, former University of South Carolina coach
 Courtney Johnson (1939–1996), banjo player, member of New Grass Revival
 Several members of The Kentucky Headhunters, award-winning country rock band
 Arthur Krock (1886–1974), journalist
 Preston Leslie (1819–1907), former governor of Kentucky 
 Louie Nunn (1924–2004), former governor of Kentucky
 Steve Nunn (born 1952), former state representative; son of Louie Nunn; pleaded guilty to murdering his former fiancée
 Diane Sawyer (born 1945), journalist and host of ABC World News
 John T. Scott (1831-1891), Justice of the Indiana Supreme Court
 Luska Twyman (1913–1988), mayor of Glasgow and first black mayor in Kentucky
 Billy Vaughn (1919–1991), musician and band leader

See also
 Park City, Kentucky, formerly known as Glasgow Junction

References

External links

 City of Glasgow official website
 Glasgow community website
 Glasgow Daily Times, local daily newspaper

 
Cities in Kentucky
County seats in Kentucky
Glasgow, Kentucky, micropolitan area
Cities in Barren County, Kentucky
Scottish-American culture in Kentucky